Wrinkles is a 2011 Spanish animated drama film directed by Ignacio Ferreras, based on the comic book with the same title by Paco Roca. The story is set in a retirement home and revolves around the friendship between two elderly men, one of them in the early stages of Alzheimer's disease.

Wrinkles was released to UK DVD and Blu-ray on April 28, 2014, following a limited theatrical release on April 18. Special features in this release include Wrinkles Animatic, Wrinkles Making Of, Peter Bradshaw reviews Wrinkles, Wrinkles Trailer, Wrinkles Teaser Trailer, and Recording the Music for Wrinkles.

Plot
This animated story opens with Emilio being dropped off at a nursing home. His son tells him that he will be happier there and leaves with a short goodbye. Emilio was a banker in life and has early Alzheimers. Miguel is his talkative roommate who gives him a tour. Miguel is truthful about getting old and how the place works. There is a pool that nobody uses but it looks good and makes the families feel better knowing it's there. Miguel cons residents out of small fees for things they will never need or use. He charges a woman for the phone so she can call her son to come and pick her up. She will forget that she intended to call. He makes a little money and she feels a little better trying to get home.

Miguel is a single never married man without children alone in old age in the nursing home. He warns Emilio to avoid the top floor. People who cannot care for themselves end up there. Some are restrained in their beds or controlled with medicine. Dolores cares for her husband Modesto and keeps him off that floor. They lock them up there when the family no longer cares. Antonia protests that view and says that she is here by choice to not be a burden on her family.

One morning Emilio wakes and seems to have lost his wallet. Miguel tells him that they'll look for it later since that day is gym day. The guys really like Wednesday because the therapist is well built.  They drop the ball on purpose so she has to bend over. Another day Emilio loses his watch and accuses Miguel of stealing. Emilio searches the room and finds Miguel's cigar box filled with money and a stash of pills. Miguel returns angry over the mistrust. The money is for independence and the pills for self-deliverance. Miguel offers to share the pills if Emilio finds his memory loss too difficult, but Emilio says he would never do that.

Seasons come and go and one day Emilio has had it and decides to leave. Miguel agrees to help and the two along with Antonia escape one night. The three crash their car and the escape fails.  Emilio's injuries and loss of memory put him on the upper floor, Antonia has a broken arm, and Miguel returns alone in his room and opens his bag of pills. They spill on the floor. As he is picking up the pills, he sees a black sock stuck under Emilio's mattress. He finds the missing watch and wallet and begins to cry. Miguel has a new outlook on life. Instead of using his fellow residents, he begins to help them.

Cast

Production
The film was produced through Perro Verde Films and co-produced by Cromosoma. The budget was two million euros. 75% of the animation work was done in Spain; the rest was outsourced to the Philippines.

Reception
Wrinkles premiered on September 19, 2011 at the San Sebastián International Film Festival. Neil Young of The Hollywood Reporter called the film "a genuine crowd pleaser deserving of the widest possible exposure" and "one of the most accomplished Spanish films, from any genre, of recent years." Young wrote: "Wrinkles takes a commendably unsentimental and nuanced approach to a complex subject, one that avoids melodramatic situations and simplistic characterizations while adhering to certain conventions of this particular subgenre.... There's no shortage of genuine poignancy here and though Nani Garcia's score largely hits conventional, predictable beats, each tear is hard earned and never simply 'jerked.' Ferreras' animation style is realistic and direct with close attention paid to tiny specifics of decor, clothing and gesture." Fionnuala Halligan wrote in Screen Daily: "Ignacio Ferreras worked on Sylvain Chomet's Oscar-nominated The Illusionist and he carries the flame forward here with the moving cel animation Wrinkles (Arrugas), easily one of the better films to emerge from San Sebastian this year." Halligan praised the characterisations of the two main characters and their relationship and wrote: "Some of the story's other aspects are more broadly sketched, however, and they could occasionally be accused of labelling out the pathos too liberally ... There are nicely-judged moments of humour, however, and Wrinkles restrains itself in a most dignified manner when it comes to the inevitable, but tender, denouement." The postscript to the film is "dedicated to all the old people of today and of tomorrow".

Accolades

See also
 2011 in film
 Cinema of Spain
 List of animated feature films

References

External links
 Official website
 
 

2011 drama films
2011 animated films
2011 films
2010s Spanish-language films
Films about old age
Spanish animated films
Spanish drama films
Animated drama films
Animated films based on comics
Films based on Spanish comics
Films about Alzheimer's disease
Animated feature films
Adult animated films
2010s Spanish films